Magnetic 2D materials or magnetic van der Waals materials are two-dimensional materials that display ordered magnetic properties such as antiferromagnetism or ferromagnetism. After the discovery of graphene in 2004, the family of 2D materials has grown rapidly. There have since been reports of several related materials, all except for magnetic materials. But since 2016 there have been numerous reports of 2D magnetic materials that can be exfoliated with ease just like graphene.

The first few-layered van der Waals magnetism was reported in 2016 for antiferromagnetic materials; for example, NiPS3, FePS3, and MnPS3. In the following year, the first 2D ferromagnets, Cr2Ge2Te6, and CrI3
were discovered in 2017. One reason for this seemingly late discovery is that thermal fluctuations tend to destroy magnetic order for 2D magnets easier compared to 3D bulk. It is also generally accepted in the community that low dimensional materials have different magnetic properties compared to bulk. This academic interest that transition from 3D to 2D magnetism can be measured has been the driving force behind much of the recent works on van der Waals magnets. Much anticipated transition of such has been since observed in both antiferromagnets and ferromagnets: FePS3, Cr2Ge2Te6, CrI3, NiPS3, MnPS3, Fe3GeTe2

Although the field has been only around since 2016, it has become one of the most active fields in condensed matter physics and materials science and engineering. There have been several review articles written up to highlight its future and promise.

Overview
Magnetic van der Waals materials is a new addition to the growing list of 2d materials. The special feature of these new materials is that they exhibit a magnetic ground state, either antiferromagnetic or ferromagnetic, when they are thinned down to very few sheets or even one layer of materials. Another, a probably more important feature of these materials is that they can be easily produced in few layers or monolayer form using simple means such as scotch tape, which is rather uncommon among other magnetic materials like oxide magnets.

Interest in these materials is based on the possibility of producing two-dimensional magnetic materials with ease. The field started with a series of papers in 2016 with a conceptual paper and a first experimental demonstration.  The field was expanded further with the publication of similar observations in ferromagnetism the following year. Since then, several new materials discovered and several review papers have been published.

Theory
Magnetic materials have their (spins) aligned over a macroscopic length scale. Alignment of the spins is typically driven by exchange interaction between neighboring spins. While at absolute zero the alignment can always exist, thermal fluctuations misalign magnetic moments at temperatures above the Curie temperature, causing a phase transition to a non-magnetic state. Whether  is above the absolute zero depends heavily on the dimensions of the system.

For a 3D system, the Curie temperature is always above zero, while a one-dimensional system can only be in a ferromagnetic state at 

For 2D systems, the transition temperature depends on the spin dimensionality. A spin dimensionality of two means that the spins are free to point in any direction parallel to the plane. A system with a spin dimensionality of three means there are no constraints on the direction of the spin. Onsager's solution to the model demonstrates that , thus allowing magnetism at obtainable temperatures. On the contrary, a system where , described by the isotropic Heisenberg model, never displays magnetism at any finite temperature. The long range ordering of the spins is prevented by the Mermin-Wagner theorem stating that spontaneous symmetry breaking required for magnetism is not possible in isotropic two dimensional magnetic systems. Spin waves in this case have finite density of states and are gapless and are therefore easy to excite, destroying magnetic order.

The 2D ising model describes the behavior of FePS3, CrI3. and Fe3GeTe2, while Cr2Ge2Te6 and MnPS3 behaves like isotropic Heisenberg model. The intrinsic anisotropy in CrI3 and Fe3GeTe2 is caused by strong spin–orbit coupling, allowing them to remain magnetic down to a monolayer, while Cr2Ge2Te6 has only exhibit magnetism as a bilayer or thicker. The XY model describes the case where . In this system, there is no transition between the ordered and unordered states, but instead the system undergoes a so-called Kosterlitz–Thouless transition at finite temperature , where at temperatures below  the system has quasi-long-range magnetic order. It was reported that the theoretical predictions of the XY model are consistent with those experimental observations of NiPS3. The Heisenberg model describes the case where . In this system, there is no transition between the ordered and unordered states because of the Mermin-Wagner theorem. The experimental realization of the Heisenberg model was reported using MnPS3.

The above systems can be described by a generalized Heisenberg spin Hamiltonian:

,

Setting  recovered the 2D Ising model and the XY model. Along with the idealized models described above, the spin Hamiltonian can be used for most experimental setups, and it can also model dipole-dipole interactions by renormalization of the parameter . However, sometimes including further neighbours or using different exchange coupling, such as antisymmetric exchange, is required.

Measuring two-dimensional magnetism
Magnetic properties of two-dimensional materials are usually measured using Raman spectroscopy, Magneto-optic Kerr effect, Magnetic circular dichroism or Anomalous Hall effect techniques. The dimensionality of the system can be determined by measuring the scaling behaviour of magnetization, susceptibility or correlation length as a function of temperature. They can be retrieved by fitting

,
 or

to the data. The critical exponents depend on the system and its dimensionality, as demonstrated in Table 1. Therefore, an abrupt change in any of the critical exponents indicates a transition between two models. Furthermore, the Curie temperature can be measured as a function of number of layers. This relation for a large  is given by

,

where  is a material dependent constant. For thin layers, the behavior changes to

Applications
Magnetic 2D materials can be used as a part of van der Waals heterostructures. They are layered materials consisting of different 2D materials held together by van der Waals forces. One example of such structure is a thin insulating/semiconducting layer between layers of 2D magnetic material, producing a magnetic tunnel junction. This structure can have significant spin valve effect, and thus they can have many applications in the field of spintronics. Another newly emerging direction came from the rather unexpected observation of magnetic exciton in NiPS3.

References

Magnetism
Ferromagnetic materials
Materials science
Two-dimensional nanomaterials
Condensed matter physics
Semiconductors